"Elvis Is Dead" is a song by Living Colour featuring Little Richard and Maceo Parker off the album Time's Up. Before, during, and after Little Richard's guest rap performance, many voices speak the song title, concluded by one announcing, "Elvis has left the building!"  After, the band twisted the line "Maybe I've a reason to believe we all will be received in Graceland" from Paul Simon's "Graceland" to yield the refrain, "I've got a reason to believe we all won't be received at Graceland." They also quote Public Enemy's "Fight the Power" in stating, "Elvis was a hero to most," but again twisted the line "But he never meant s--t to me" to "But that's beside the point."

Track listing
 "Elvis Is Dead" - 3:51
 "Memories Can't Wait (Live)" - 5:06
 "Love And Happiness" - 5:09

Charts

Personnel
 Will Calhoun - drums
 Corey Glover - vocals
 Maceo Parker - saxophone
 Vernon Reid - guitar
 Little Richard - vocals 
 Muzz Skillings - bass
 Mick Jagger - voice at wake

References

Living Colour songs
1990 singles
Songs written by Vernon Reid
Song recordings produced by Ed Stasium
Epic Records singles
1990 songs
Songs about death
Songs about Elvis Presley